"Spellbound" is a song by English rock band Siouxsie and the Banshees. It was written by the group and co-produced with Nigel Gray. It was released in 1981 by record label Polydor as the first single from the band's fourth studio album, Juju.  

Prior to recording the song, the band had been on tour in the UK in February 1981 to premiere the new material composed with guitarist John McGeoch. When reviewing this era, Barney Hoskyns of  NME had described "Spellbound" as a "glorious electric storm", further adding, "Siouxsie and the Banshees are one of the great British bands of all time".

Release 
"Spellbound" was released by Polydor on 22 May 1981. The single peaked at number 22 on the UK Singles Chart in 1981. It also reached 64 on the U.S. National Disco Action Top 80 chart.

The 12" extended version of the song appeared on the 2006 remastered version of Juju.

Reception and legacy 
In their contemporary review, Melody Maker praised the single, calling it "exhilarating". The Guardian retrospectively hailed it as a "pop marvel".

In 2006, Mojo honoured McGeoch by rating him in their list of "100 Greatest Guitarists of All Time" for his work on "Spellbound". Johnny Marr of the Smiths stated on BBC Radio 2 in February 2008 that he rated guitarist John McGeoch highly for his work on "Spellbound". Marr said: "It's so clever. He's got this really good picky thing going on which is very un-rock'n'roll and this actual tune he's playing is really quite mysterious".

The song featured in the end credits of the finale of the 4th season of Stranger Things, "The Piggyback" and the end credits of the season 4 episode of True Blood, "Spellbound". It is also played on the radio in the background in Empire of Light.

Personnel 

 Siouxsie Sioux – vocals 
 Steven Severin – bass  
 John McGeoch – guitar
 Budgie – drums and percussion

Track listing 
 7"

 12"

Charts

References 

1981 singles
Siouxsie and the Banshees songs
Polydor Records singles
Song recordings produced by Nigel Gray
1981 songs
Songs written by Siouxsie Sioux
Songs written by Budgie (musician)
Songs written by Steven Severin
Songs written by John McGeoch